Battle of Britain is a 1999 computer wargame developed and published by TalonSoft. It was designed by Gary Grigsby and Keith Brors.

Gameplay
Set in World War II, Battle of Britain is a computer wargame that simulates the conflict between Germany and the United Kingdom during the Battle of Britain.

Development
Battle of Britain was developed by TalonSoft and was designed by Gary Grigsby and Keith Brors. The pair had previously co-created the Steel Panthers series at Strategic Simulations Inc. (SSI), but had left the company in late 1997 to join TalonSoft, with the stated goal of making a wargame based on the Battle of Britain. It was planned as the pair's first of three games for TalonSoft, and was originally entitled Battle of Britain 1941 and set for a release date of August 1998. According to Alan Dunkin of GameSpot, the game was envisioned as a semi-remake of Grigsby's earlier game U.S.A.A.F. - United States Army Air Force. It was Grigsby's first attempt at an air-combat title since U.S.A.A.F.; the subject matter was relatively rare in computer wargames at the time. Grigsby and Brors developed the game while simultaneously working on a fourth Steel Panthers game at SSI.

The game was Grigsby's first game developed for Microsoft Windows.

Reception

According to David Chong of Computer Games Strategy Plus, critical reactions toward the game were "lukewarm", as it received above-average reviews according to the review aggregation website GameRankings. Reviewing the game for PC Gamer US, William R. Trotter concluded, "There's a lot to admire in the depth and accuracy of this simulation, but you'd better be a serious student of the World War Two air war. For everyone else, it may just be too much work."

Legacy
In late 1999, the game received a "follow-up" game from TalonSoft, entitled 12 O'Clock High: Bombing the Reich. It was again designed by Gary Grigsby and Keith Brors. It reused the game engine from Battle of Britain. In 2009, publisher Matrix Games reworked and re-released the game and 12 O'Clock High together as Gary Grigsby's Eagle Day to Bombing the Reich.

References

External links

1999 video games
Battle of Britain
Grand strategy video games
Video games about Nazi Germany
Video games developed in the United States
Windows games
Windows-only games
World War II video games
Computer wargames
Turn-based strategy video games
Video games set in the United Kingdom
Multiplayer and single-player video games
TalonSoft games